The Cocoa Research Institute of Nigeria (CRIN) in Oyo State, Nigeria, is a cocoa research institute established by the Federal Government of Nigeria through the Nigeria Research Institute Act of 1964.  The act established research institutes for cocoa, palm oil, coffee and cola.

CRIN was established to promote and improve the productivity of cocoa and its product in Nigeria and globally.  CRIN was originally part of the West Africa Cocoa Research Institute (WACRI) based in Tafo, Ghana.

Cocoa and its product serves as a source of income and employment for farmers in the cocoa producing states of Nigeria.

The primary function of CRIN is to conduct high quality research in cocoa, kola, and coffee as well as to provide facilities for teaching and research with these agricultural products.

Research
CRIN released new varieties of cocoa in 2013.

References

Agricultural organizations based in Nigeria
1964 establishments in Nigeria
Oyo State
Research institutes in Nigeria
Agricultural research institutes